The UM Arena Stadium (literally UM Arena Sports Science Stadium) is a stadium located inside the University of Malaya in Kuala Lumpur, Malaysia. It holds 1,000 people. The stadium was used in the 2017 SEA Games football tournament and the 2018 AFC U-16 Championship.

References

External links
Facilities at the University of Malaya

Football venues in Malaysia
Sports venues in Kuala Lumpur
University of Malaya